The 2020–21 Minnesota Golden Gophers men's ice hockey season was the 100th season of play for the program. They represented the University of Minnesota in the 2020–21 NCAA Division I men's ice hockey season. This season marked the 31st season in the Big Ten Conference. They were coached by Bob Motzko, in his third season, and played their home games at 3M Arena at Mariucci.

Season
As a result of the ongoing COVID-19 pandemic the entire college ice hockey season was delayed. Because the NCAA had previously announced that all winter sports athletes would retain whatever eligibility they possessed through at least the following year, none of Minnesota's players would lose a season of play. However, the NCAA also approved a change in its transfer regulations that would allow players to transfer and play immediately rather than having to sit out a season, as the rules previously required.

Despite all of the uncertainty about the season, Minnesota began with a tremendous start. The team won its first 10 games, rocketing up the rankings and claiming the top spot for 5 consecutive weeks. After losing their first game of the season to Wisconsin, the Gophers were stunned by Notre Dame and were swept on home ice. After falling to #4, the team took its frustrations out on Arizona State, scoring 10 goals in back-to-back games. The astounding weekend provided the first double-digit-goal game for the program in 17 years and the first time they had done so in consecutive games since 1983. The Gophers hung near the top of the ranking for the remainder of the season, but a second home sweep, this time by Wisconsin, prevented Minnesota from not only receiving the top spot but also caused the Gophers to finish second in the Big Ten standings. By losing 3 out of 4 against the Badgers, Minnesota finished .002 behind Wisconsin due to the team cancelling a weekend series against Penn State.

While the team missed out on a regular season title, the bigger hit came by missing out on the bye for the conference tournament. Minnesota faced Michigan State in the quarterfinals and, despite outshooting the Spartans, found themselves trailing late in the third period. Minnesota wasn't able to score a single goal on MSU until less than 5 minutes remained but they were saved by the second worst offense in the nation and ended regulation with a 1–1 tie. Minnesota completely dominated the extra session, shooting 13 shots on goal in just over 10 minutes, and won the game on a goal from the team's scoring leader, Sampo Ranta. After the narrow escape, the Golden Gophers found themselves in another nail-biter, having to get past Michigan in the semifinals. The Wolverines held Minnesota at bay and built a 2-goal lead after 40 minutes. The Gophers were matched shot-for-shot by Michigan in the third but the Maroon and Gold found the net twice and tied the score. This time it only took 6 extra minutes before team captain Sammy Walker netted the game-winner, sending Minnesota to the title game. Still smarting over losing out on the regular season title, Minnesota got out to a lead in the first and then used a huge second period to build a 4-goal lead. The Gophers needed every goal because Wisconsin came roaring back in the third, firing 21 shots in the final frame alone and scoring three times to cut the lead to 1. With time winding down and the Gophers clinging to their lead, Wisconsin was forced to pull their goaltender. Minnesota scored an empty-net goal to seal the game and win the team's first Big Ten Championship in six years.

Minnesota received the 3rd overall seed and was given the top spot in the West Regional bracket. The team lived up to their billing in the opening game by overwhelming Omaha 7–2. In their second game, the Gophers faced #5 Minnesota State after the mavericks had won the program's first tournament game at the Division I level. MSU was riding high and played a nearly perfect game, holding the Gophers to just 9 shots on goal through the first two periods. Minnesota woke up in the third and started shooting the puck but the team couldn't get anything by Dryden McKay and the Golden Gophers ended their season with a 0–4 loss.

Colin Schmidt and Noah Weber sat out the season.

Departures

Recruiting

Roster
As of January 3, 2021.

Standings

Schedule and results

|-
!colspan=12 style="color:white; background:#862334; " | Regular season

|-
!colspan=12 style="color:white; background:#862334; " | 

|-
!colspan=12 style="color:white; background:#862334; " |

Scoring statistics

Goaltending statistics

Rankings

USCHO did not release a poll in week 20.

Awards and honors

Players drafted into the NHL

2021 NHL Entry Draft

† incoming freshman

References

External links

Minnesota Golden Gophers men's ice hockey seasons
Minnesota
Minnesota
Minnesota Golden Gophers
Minnesota Golden Gophers